Ausente may refer to:

Geography
 , tributary of the Liris close to where it flows into the Tyrrhenian Sea

Persons
El Ausente, a title of José Antonio Primo de Rivera, a Spanish political figure

Spanish language film and television
Ausente mean absent in Spanish:
Ausente (film), a 2011 film by Argentinean director Marco Berger
Ausente, a 2008 Chilean film directed by Nicolás Acuña
, a 2005 Spanish film by director Daniel Calparsoro
El Ausente, a 1989 Argentine film directed and written by Rafael Filipelli
La Ausente, original Spanish title of the 1951 Mexican drama film  The Absentee directed by Julio Bracho

See also
Absence (disambiguation)